Karen Walker (born 29 July 1969) is an English former international football centre-forward. She played for Doncaster Belles for 20 years, starting at the age of 15, and began playing for England as a teenager, making 83 appearances and scoring a record 40 goals until she retired from international football in 2003. Walker's uncompromising style of play earned her the sobriquet "Wacker".

Walker is particularly remembered for her performances in the 1995 World Cup in Sweden. She finished her career with two seasons at Leeds United, and in her last game, against Arsenal in the 2006 FA Cup Final, she left the pitch to a standing ovation.

In 2007, she was part of the BBC team covering the FIFA Women's World Cup in China. Later that year she was inducted into the English Football Hall of Fame.

Club career
Walker's neighbour, Karen Skillcorn, was already playing for Doncaster Belles and recruited Walker as a fifteen-year-old. After a period as a substitute, Walker became first choice when the club's regular centre-forward became pregnant. In a long career with the club she eventually played in 11 FA Women's Cup finals, winning five of them. With the formation of the National Division in 1991, Walker scored 36 goals in 14 games to help Doncaster win the inaugural title. Red Star Southampton were vanquished 4–0 in the 1992 WFA Cup Final as the club won a League and Cup double. Walker reportedly set a record by scoring a hat-trick in every round of the Cup, including the final.

International career
In July 1988, Walker made her England debut as a teenager against an Italy B team in the Mundialito tournament. Scoring with her first kick of the ball inspired Walker to take her subsequent football career much more seriously.

International goals
Since The Football Association took over the team in 1993. Scores and results list England's goal tally first.

References

1969 births
Living people
People from Mexborough
Footballers from Doncaster
English women's footballers
English Football Hall of Fame inductees
Doncaster Rovers Belles L.F.C. players
Leeds United Women F.C. players
England women's international footballers
FA Women's National League players
1995 FIFA Women's World Cup players
Women's association football forwards